Masato Matsui (松井 雅人, born November 19, 1987 in Japan) is a Japanese professional baseball catcher. He previously played for the Chunichi Dragons and Orix Buffaloes.

External links

1987 births
Living people
Baseball people from Gunma Prefecture
Jobu University alumni
Japanese baseball players
Nippon Professional Baseball catchers
Chunichi Dragons players
Orix Buffaloes players